Mabel Trunnelle (November 8, 1879 – April 20, 1981) was an American actress who appeared in 194 films between 1908 and 1923.

Biography
Trunnelle was born in Dwight, Illinois and died in Glendale, California.

Photoplay magazine argued that she was the merry-serious girl whose expressive eyes and face mirror emotions more effectively than a hundred voices. She was educated upon the stage for the five years she had spent in films, mostly before Edison cameras. Miss Trunnelle was a modest, cheerful, winsome young American wife whose husband was Herbert Prior.

She was a prominent star in early silent films of Edison Films, and frequently co-starred with Prior.

Selected filmography
 A Woman's Way (1908) *short
 Nursing a Viper (1909) *short
 Silver Threads Among the Gold (1911) *short
 The Lighthouse by the Sea (1911) *short
 Ranson's Folly (1915)
 Eugene Aram (1915)
 The Heart of the Hills (1916)
 Where Love Is (1917)
The Grell Mystery (1917)
 Singed Wings (1922)
The Love Trap (1923)

References

External links

1879 births
1981 deaths
20th-century American actresses
American film actresses
American silent film actresses
Actresses from Illinois
People from Dwight, Illinois
American centenarians
Women centenarians